Yevgeni Vasilyevich Skomorokhov (July 11, 1945 – November 10, 2002) was a Russian professional football coach and player.

References

External links
 Career summary by KLISF

1945 births
2002 deaths
Soviet footballers
Pakhtakor Tashkent FK players
Soviet football managers
Russian football managers
FC Torpedo Moscow managers
Esteghlal F.C. managers
Russian Premier League managers
Association football defenders
FC Yenisey Krasnoyarsk players
Russian expatriate football managers